Lithuania  competed at the 2013 Summer Universiade in Kazan, Russia from 6 to 17 July 2013.

Medalists

Medals by sport

Athletics

Men
Track & road events

Lithuania was registered to compete in 4x100 m relay but did not start.

Field events

Women
Track & road events

Lithuania was registered to compete in 4x100 m relay but did not start.

Field events

Basketball

Men's tournament

|}

Belt wrestling 

Women
Indrė Bubelytė (58 kg.)
Giedrė Blekaitytė (66 kg.)

Men
Povilas Žukauskas (68 kg.)
Justinas Gramba (70 kg.)
Domas Zimkus (80 kg.)
M. Labalaukis (+90 kg.)
Zigmas Pečiulis (+100 kg.)

Boxing 

Men

Canoeing 

Jevgenij Shuklin
Mindaugas Maldonis
Ignas Navakauskas
Ričardas Nekriošius
Andrej Olijnik
Laimonas Smulkys
Dovilė Sudeikytė
Vytautas Vasiliauskas

Judo 

Karolis Bauža
Gintarė Klišytė
Marius Labalaukis
Santa Pakenytė
Vytautas Skilinskas
Žilvinas Zabarauskas

Rowing 

Qualification Legend: FA=Final A (medal); FB=Final B (non-medal); SA/B=Semifinals A/B; ; R=Repechage

Sambo 

Karina Bičkutė
Gintarė Klišytė
Marius Labalaukis
Radvilas Matukas
Vytautas Skilinskas
Aurelija Šukytė
Žilvinas Zabarauskas

Shooting

Swimming 

Matas Andriekus
Simonas Bilis
Vaidotas Blažys
Igor Kozlovskij
Ramūnas Paknys
Mindaugas Sadauskas
Giedrius Titenis

Weightlifting

Wrestling 

Giedrė Blekaitytė
Indrė Bubelytė 
Marijus Grygelis
Šarūnas Jurčys
Vilius Laurinaitis
Julius Matuzevičius
Jonas Rudavičius

References 

Nations at the 2013 Summer Universiade
2013 in Lithuanian sport
Lithuania at the Summer Universiade